Sakzai, also called Sakzi or Sakazay, are a Pashtun tribe of the Ghilji branch in Afghanistan located around the historical region of Sistan (modern day Nimroz, Helmand and Farah), as well as the Ghor region and the northern parts of the Sistan and Baluchestan Province of Iran. Also they can be found among the Baloch tribes.

The Sakzai are 24 subtribes and 95 or 96 clans and approximately make up around 7.5% of Afghanistans nomadic population.
Their name suggests a connection with the historic East Iranian Saka tribes of Central Asia, as well as the historical inhabitants of the region,

References

Further reading

Pashtun tribes
Ethnic groups in Helmand Province